Xylocarpus is a genus of plants in the mahogany family (Meliaceae). It includes two or three species of mangroves, native to coastal mangrove forests of the Western and Central Indo-Pacific, from eastern Africa to Tonga.

Xylocarpus is the only mangrove genus in family Meliaceae.

Species

References

External links

Mangroves
Meliaceae genera
Meliaceae